EBAN (European Business Angel Network) is an international, not-for-profit organisation whose function is to represent the pan-European early stage investor community, gathering member organisations and individuals from Europe and beyond. Originally targeted only to business angels, today EBAN is a cross sector representative of equity early stage investors.

EBAN represents a sector estimated to invest 5.1billion Euros a year and comprising 260.000 angel investors. According to its annual collection of data (2012) and exclusively though business angel networks, 2900 company were funded and 17800 jobs were created.

History
EBAN was established in 1999 by a group of pioneer angel networks in Europe with the collaboration of the European Commission and EURADA (the European Association of Development Agencies). In 1999, only 50 business angel networks were identified across Europe to support high growth start-ups, with more than half operating in the UK. Today, the number of business angel networks has risen to 460.

Activities
 Setting professional standards, training, and certification for the early stage investment asset class; building the capacity of early stage investment actors to facilitate co-investment as well as increasing transparency in the market by changing the culture on reporting standards.
 Benchmarking, research and networking with peers .
 Lobbying, trusted and continued dialogue with European policy makers to improve the working environment of early stage investors.
 Raising awareness, advocacy and capacity building. 
 Cross-border syndication and co-investment support.

Structure

Types of members accepted by EBAN (31/12/2013)
 Business Angels
 Business angels networks 
 Federations of business angels networks
 Early stage venture capital funds
 Business accelerators
 Electronic funding platforms
 Associate/ other early stage market players

Governance
EBAN is led by a Board of Directors elected for 2-year mandates. The Board selects a President and an Executive Committee which becomes involved in the day-to-day operations with the Secretariat.

EBAN Presidents
 2018–present Peter Cowley, Martlet and Cambridge Angels, United Kingdom
 2014-2018 Candace Johnson, Sophia Business Angels, France
 2012-2014 Paulo Andrez, FNABA, Portugal
 2010-2012 Brigitte Baumann, Go Beyond, Switzerland
 2006-2010 Anthony Clarke, London Business Angels, United Kingdom
 2003-2006 Peter Jungen, BAND, Germany  
Before 2003, co-presidency system

Executive committee
Executive committee composition  at (31-12-2013)
 Paulo Andrez, FNABA, Portugal (President) 
 Ari Korhonen, FiBAN, Finland (Vice-President) 
 Albert Colomer, ESBAN, Catalunya 
 Baybars Altuntaş, TBAA, Turkey

Annual events and past editions

Annual Congress
Two days annual meeting organized in order to debate the role of early stage investors in Europe as key players to foster growth, learning, lobbying and networking. Different speeches, workshops, venues and the awards ceremony for the EBAN annual prizes.

EBAN University
Meeting organized in order to debate about different relevant themes linked with early stage investing and for learning and networking. Different speeches and workshops.

Past EBAN awards 
Source:

Winners of the 9th EBAN Awards (2014)
 European Early Stage Investor of the Year: Jari Ovaskainen (Finland) 
 Most Successful Firm Financed by Early Stage Investors: DecaWave (Ireland)
 Best Individual in globably engaging Early Stage Investors within the Entrepreneurial Ecosystem: Baybars Altuntas (Turkey) 
 Best EBAN Member: Business Angels Copenhagen (Denmark)
 Best EBAN Newcomer: Estonian Business Angels Network (Estonia)
 Best European Business Angel Week Initiative: Startech Ventres (Greece)

Winners of the 8th EBAN Awards (2013)
 Business Angel of the Year: Dušan Stoiljković, True Global Ventures (Sweden)
 Business Angel Network of the Year: IESE BAN  (Spain)
 Best Federation of the Year: HBAN  (Ireland)
 Best Early Stage Fund: Vera Early Stage Fund (Finland)
 Best Performing New Member:  Austrian Angels Investors Association (AAIA, Austria)
 
Winners of the 7th EBAN Awards (2012) 
Business Angel of the Year: Philippe Gluntz, Business Angel affiliated to Paris Business Angels (France)
Deal of the Year: United Resins, submitted by FNABA (Portugal)
Early Stage Fund of the Year: Zernike Meta Venture, submitted by META Group (Italy)
Breakthrough Service/ Tool by a BAN: PEEX, submitted by Mountain Partners (Switzerland)
Business Angel Network of the Year: FiBAN (Finland); Honorable Mention awarded to Paris Business Angels (France)
 
Winners of the 6th EBAN Awards (2011) 
 Business Angel of the Year: Francesco Marini Clarelli  (Italy)
 Deal of the Year: Polidea (Poland)
 Early Stage Fund of the Year: Seraphim (UK)
 Impact Investment of the Year: EKO-Logic (Poland)
 Breakthrough Service/ Tool by a BAN: Paris Business Angels (France) for Angelsoft (USA)

Winners of the 5th EBAN Awards (2010)
 Business angel of the year: Véronique Castelo (FR)
 Business angel group of the year: Sophia Business Angels (FR)
 Best investment in a social enterprise: Biogenera, submitted by Italian Angels for Growth and Meta Group (IT)
 Best early stage fund manager/team of the year: Succès Europe (FR)
 
Winners of the 4th EBAN Awards (2009)
 Business angel of the year: Cornelius Boersch (DE)
 European early stage fund manager/team: Guy Rigaud, Rhônes Alpes Création (FR)
 European business angel group leader/team: Paris Business Angels (FR)
 Best cross border deal: Tie between BUY VIP and Louise (EU)
 Most successful angel backed company: Aventiv (BE)
 Best lobbying initiative (in support of business angels and early stage investors): Italian Business Angels Network (IT)
 
Winners of the 3rd EBAN Awards (2008)
 Best team of the year: Greater London Enterprise (UK)
 Best business angel of the year: Nelson Gray (Scotland)
 Best syndicated deal (BA/VC): Swedish Venture Capital Association (SE)
 Best new initiative/new entrant on the market: The Ready for Equity! Project (EU)
 
Winners of the 2nd EBAN Awards (2007)
 BAN manager of the year: Finance South East for the South East Capital Alliance (UK)
 Best new initiative on the market: London Business Angels for The Creative Business Accelerator (UK)
 Business angel of the year: NeBIB for Hans Bertram (NL)
 Most promising exit: London Business Angels for Pout (UK)

Winners of the 1st EBAN Awards (2006)
 Most promising exit: London Business Angels (UK)
 Best benchmarking work: ESBAN (ES)
 Best new network tool practice: France Angels (FR)
 Best co-investment initiative: BANSON (DE)

Involvement in European Projects
EBAN has collaborated with the following European Commission projects:

ICT Finance MarketPlace/ Access ICT - European Platform for Access to ICT Investors (2010-2012)
EASY - Early Stage Investor (2006-2008)
Ready4Equity (2006-2008)

References

External links
 EBAN website

Non-profit organizations based in Europe
Organizations established in 1999
Angel investors